Cooper v. Aaron, 358 U.S. 1 (1958), was a landmark decision of the Supreme Court of the United States, which denied the school board of Little Rock, Arkansas, the right to delay racial desegregation for 30 months. On September 12, 1958, the Warren Court handed down a per curiam decision which held that the states are bound by the Court's decisions and must enforce them even if the states disagree with them, which asserted judicial supremacy established in Marbury v. Madison. The decision in this case upheld the rulings in Brown v. Board of Education and Brown II which held that the doctrine of separate but equal was unconstitutional.

Background of the case

In the wake of Brown v. Board of Education (1954), the school district of Little Rock, Arkansas formulated a plan to desegregate its schools. Meanwhile, other school districts in the state opposed the Supreme Court's rulings and did not make any attempts to desegregate their schools. The Arkansas state legislature amended the state constitution to oppose desegregation and then passed a law relieving children from mandatory attendance at integrated schools. During this time the school board of Little Rock still continued with desegregation.

However, on February 20, 1958, five months after the integration crisis involving the Little Rock Nine, members of the Little Rock school board (along with the Superintendent of Schools) filed suit in the United States District Court for the Eastern District of Arkansas, seeking to suspend their plan for desegregation. They alleged that public hostility to desegregation along with opposition by Governor Orval Faubus and the state legislature created "chaos, bedlam and turmoil". The relief the plaintiffs requested was for the African-American children to be returned to segregated schools and for the implementation of the desegregation plan to be postponed until January 1961. The district court granted the school board's request, but the United States Court of Appeals for the Eighth Circuit reversed that decision after the NAACP, represented by Thurgood Marshall, appealed. Prior to the Eighth Circuit's decision, the Supreme Court had denied the defendants' request to decide the case without waiting for the appeals court to deliberate on the case. Once the appeals court handed down their decision in favor of the defendants, the school board appealed to the Supreme Court, which met in a rare special session to hear arguments.

The court's decision
In a joint opinion authored by all nine Justices (the only instance of that occurring on record), but primarily drafted by Justice Brennan, the Court noted that the school board had acted in good faith, asserting that most of the problems stemmed from the official opposition of the Arkansas state government to racial integration. Nonetheless, it was constitutionally impermissible under the Equal Protection Clause to maintain law and order by depriving the black students of their equal rights under the law.

More importantly, the Court held that since the Supremacy Clause of Article VI made the US Constitution the supreme law of the land and Marbury v. Madison (1803) made the Supreme Court the final interpreter of the Constitution, the precedent set forth in Brown v. Board of Education is the supreme law of the land and is therefore binding on all the states, regardless of any state laws contradicting it. The Court therefore rejected the contention that the Arkansas legislature and Governor were not bound by the Brown decision. The Supreme Court also rejected the doctrines of nullification and interposition in this case, which had been invoked by segregationists. Segregation supporters argued that the states have the power to nullify federal laws or court rulings that they believe to be unconstitutional and the states could use this power to nullify the Brown decision. The Arkansas laws that attempted to prevent desegregation were Arkansas' effort to nullify the Brown decision. The Supreme Court held that the Brown decision "can neither be nullified openly and directly by state legislators or state executive or judicial officers nor nullified indirectly by them through evasive schemes for segregation." Thus, Cooper v. Aaron held that state attempts to nullify federal law are ineffective.

Moreover, since public officials are required to swear an oath to uphold the Constitution (as per Article VI, Clause 3), the officials who ignored the supremacy of the Court's precedent in the Brown case violated their oaths. Cooper also maintained that even though education is the responsibility of the state government, that responsibility must be carried out in a manner consistent with the requirements of the Constitution, particularly the Fourteenth Amendment.

Critical response
Despite all nine Justices signing the opinion, Justice Frankfurter published a separate, concurring, opinion. He was, however, dissuaded from announcing it the same day as the main opinion by Justices Brennan and Black, who felt a unanimous decision would emphasize how strongly the Court felt about the issue. Frankfurter's opinion did not directly contradict the majority opinion, but it did reemphasize the importance of judicial supremacy and expressed disdain for the Arkansas State Legislature's actions.

Some legal scholars criticized the Court's rationale in Cooper.  Perhaps the most famous criticism of the case was that of former US Attorney General Edwin Meese, in a law review article entitled The Law of the Constitution. There, Meese accused the Court of taking too much power for itself by setting itself up as the sole institution responsible for the interpretation of the Constitution. He wrote that while judicial interpretation of the Constitution binds the parties of the case, it should not establish a supreme law of the land that must be accepted by all persons.

See also
List of United States Supreme Court cases, volume 358

Notes

Sources
Farber, Daniel A.; Eskridge, William N., Jr.; Frickey, Philip P.  Constitutional Law:  Themes for the Constitution's Third Century.  Thomson-West Publishing, 2003.  
Hall, Kermit L. ed.  The Oxford Companion to the Supreme Court of the United States, Second Edition.  Oxford University Press, 2005.  
Freyer, Tony A. Little Rock on Trial: Cooper v. Aaron and School  Desegregation. Lawrence (KS), 2007.

External links
 
Encyclopedia of Arkansas History & Culture entry: Aaron v. Cooper

United States Supreme Court cases
United States Supreme Court cases of the Warren Court
Supremacy Clause case law
United States racial desegregation case law
1958 in United States case law
Nullification (U.S. Constitution)
Legal history of Arkansas
Civil rights movement case law
Education in Little Rock, Arkansas
Thurgood Marshall
United States Supreme Court per curiam opinions